The twelfth and final season of NYPD Blue premiered on ABC on September 21, 2004, and concluded on March 1, 2005.

Note:  Garcelle Beauvais-Nilon, Jessalyn Gilsig, and John F. O'Donohue did not return for the twelfth season. With the exception of Eddie Gibson being replaced as squad commander, their absences are not explained to the audience.

Episodes

References

NYPD Blue seasons
2004 American television seasons
2005 American television seasons